Nova Haleshchyna is an urban-type settlement in Kremenchuk Raion of Poltava Oblast in Ukraine. It is located on the left bank of the Rydka, a left tributary of the Psel in the drainage basin of the Dnieper. Nova Haleshchyna hosts the administration of Nova Haleshchyna settlement hromada, one of the hromadas of Ukraine. Population: 

Until 18 July 2020, Nova Haleshchyna belonged to Kozelshchyna Raion. The raion was abolished in July 2020 as part of the administrative reform of Ukraine, which reduced the number of raions of Poltava Oblast to four. The area of Kozelshchyna Raion was merged into Kremenchuk Raion.

Economy

Transportation
Haleshchyna railway station is located in Nova Haleshchyna. It is on the railway connecting Poltava and Kremenchuk. there is infrequent passenger traffic.

The settlement has access to the Highway M22 connecting Poltava with Oleksandriia via Kremenchuk.

References

Urban-type settlements in Kremenchuk Raion